Pavel Stanovský (born 18 April 1948) is a Czech gymnast. He competed in eight events at the 1972 Summer Olympics.

References

1948 births
Living people
Czech male artistic gymnasts
Olympic gymnasts of Czechoslovakia
Gymnasts at the 1972 Summer Olympics
Place of birth missing (living people)